Barsine (c. 363–309 BC) was the daughter of a Persian father, Artabazus, satrap of Hellespontine Phrygia, and a Greek Rhodian mother, the sister of mercenaries Mentor of Rhodes and Memnon of Rhodes. Barsine became the wife of her uncle Mentor, and after his death married her second uncle, Memnon.

In 334 BC, the year of Alexander's invasion of Asia, she and her children were sent by Memnon to the king Darius III as hostages for his fidelity; and in the ensuing year, when Damascus was betrayed to the Macedonians, she fell into the hands of Alexander, by whom it is argued that she became the mother of Heracles. The relationship with Alexander is highly doubtful – of the five main sources, only Plutarch and Justin mention Barsine as Alexander's mistress. Arrian does mention Barsine once – not that she was Alexander's mistress, but that Alexander gave the daughter of Barsine and Mentor in marriage to Nearchus at the Susa weddings. It is probable that the relationship of Barsine and Alexander was made up to justify the parentage of Heracles.

Twelve years after Alexander's death in 323, Nearchus, who was Barsine's son-in-law, unsuccessfully advocated for Heracles' claim to the throne, who was, then, seventeen, which meant he was born about five years after Barsine and Alexander supposedly met in Damascus, in 333 BC. From a comparison of the accounts of Diodorus and Justin, it appears that he was brought up at Pergamum under his mother's care, and that she shared his fate when in 309 BC Polyperchon was induced by Cassander to murder him. Barsine is sometimes confused with Stateira II, wife of Alexander, and who also may have been called "Barsine".

Notes

References
 Smith, William (editor); Dictionary of Greek and Roman Biography and Mythology, "Barsine (1)", Boston, (1867)
 

Mistresses of Alexander the Great
Phrygia
Iranian people of Greek descent
People who died under the regency of Cassander
4th-century BC women
360s BC births
309 BC deaths
Women of the Achaemenid Empire
4th-century BC Iranian people